Notre Dame School or Notre Dame des Missions School was a private, Roman Catholic school for girls in Churchtown, Dublin, Ireland, opened in 1953 and closed in 2019.

History
Notre Dame was established in 1953 by the Notre Dame des Missions Sisters. The Notre Dame des Missions Sisters decided to exit the education sector in Ireland in the early 2000s, and they passed the operation of the school to the Notre Dame Schools Trust Ltd. The school was closed in June 2019 due to financial difficulties.

Operations
Annual school fees in 2015 were around €4,300 per annum.

Notable alumni 
 Mary Lou McDonald, politician

References

External links 
 

Secondary schools in Dublin (city)
Private schools in the Republic of Ireland
Defunct schools in the Republic of Ireland
Defunct Catholic schools in Ireland
Educational institutions established in 1953
1953 establishments in Ireland
Educational institutions disestablished in 2019
2019 disestablishments in Ireland